Chemseddine Chtibi ( – born on 14  December  1982, Amizmiz, Morocco) is a Moroccan international footballer who currently plays as a midfielder for FAR Rabat in the Moroccan top league.

Biography

Career
Chitbi started his footballing career in the youth team of FUS Rabat and went on to join their first team in 2005. In his time at FUS Rabat he won the CAF Confederations Cup and Moroccan Cup.

In 2011, he joined Maghreb Fez on a two year contract and scored his first goal against Jeunesse Sportive de Kabylie in the CAF Confederations Cup which he won in the final against Tunisian Club Africain. Also in his first season he won Moroccan Cup beating CODM Meknes in the final. He also won the Super Cup against Esperance de Tunis. This meant that he won 3 trophies in his only season at Maghreb Fez as not long after this he joined Raja Casablanca.

References

Moroccan footballers
1982 births
Living people
Sportspeople from Marrakesh
Morocco international footballers
Raja CA players
AS FAR (football) players
Association football midfielders